Sigma Alpha Epsilon Pi is a national Jewish sorority. It was founded on October 1, 1998, at the University of California, Davis.

History
In the early 1990s with the closing of a national Jewish sorority on its campus, the University of California, Davis was left without a Jewish women's social organization. Several women on campus noticed the gap left by the absence of the former sorority and began strategizing how to start an organization on campus that would fill the need. Members of Alpha Epsilon Pi, a national Jewish fraternity, also urged the women of Davis to start a Jewish women's social organization of their own. With positive response from the campus Sigma Alpha Epsilon Pi was formed.

The "Sigma" is meant to represent "sisters of" in honor of Alpha Epsilon Pi's contributions towards the formation of the sorority. Sigma is also the 18th letter of the Greek alphabet; in Jewish tradition, the number eighteen means chai (life). The six women who founded the sorority—Alycia Seaman, Erin Glick, Leah Dansker, Rachel Rothfarb, Erin Barker, and Dana Miller—are considered the eternal mothers of the sorority.

Despite its formative Jewish identity the sorority allows no discrimination based on race, ethnicity, national origin, religion, sexual orientation, or handicap. SAEPi's publication is called The Iris Petal, with a quarterly publication schedule.

The first season of MTV’s Sorority Life was filmed in the spring of 2002 on the UC Davis campus featuring members and pledges of ΣΑΕΠ. Through the airing of the show, ΣΑΕΠ began to expand across the country.

Symbols 
The sorority's mascot is the lioness, representing "strength, power and force." The sorority's flower is the blue iris. From the Iris, its colors are blue and gold, explained as. "Blue is prominent in Judaism, and gold symbolizes the richness ΣΑΕΠ brings to its members." Additionally, these colors are used to identify the University of California, where the sorority was founded. The sorority's gemstone is the sapphire.

Mission, Vision, and Values
Mission: "The purpose of this organization is to promote unity, support, and a Jewish awareness, as well as to provide a Jewish experience for ourselves, our members, and the community as a whole. This organization is devoted to friendship, motivation, opportunity, leadership, and well-being."

Vision: "Our vision is to provide a Jewish environment for collegiate women to grow as individuals and leaders."

Values: Unity, Trust, Strength, Sincere Sisterhood, and Exemplifying Jewish Values. These values define the sorority as a community. Members, individually and collectively, aim to live these values both in and out of the context of the organization.

National Board
A national board was started in the summer of 2002 to oversee the expansion and growth of ΣΑΕΠ as a nationwide sorority. Currently, there are seven alumnae from different chapters voluntarily serving as the directors on the National Board. In early 2017, the National Board voted to restructure in order to consolidate operational functions into the Executive Office, maintaining the National Board for governance, strategic planning, and oversight.

2021-2022 National Board members are:

Past President: Dawn Savage (Mu)
President: Rachel Allen (Mu)
President-Elect: Alexandra Morris (Tau)
Secretary: Hannah Kaufman (Mu)
Treasurer: Deborah Joseph Friedman (Eta)
Regional Governor - West: Melissa Oxenhandler (Upsilon)
Regional Governor - East: Shaina Fischer (Xi)

National Philanthropy
At the 2008 national convention, Cancer Schmancer was selected as the sorority's national philanthropy. In 2011 the National Board re-evaluated the national philanthropy and decided to move on to an organization that encompasses all of the philosophies of Sigma Alpha Epsilon Pi. American Jewish World Service was chosen. In addition to the national philanthropy, some chapters also support local philanthropies.

Chapter list
Chapters of Sigma Alpha Epsilon Pi follow. Active chapters are listed in bold and inactive chapters are listed in italic.

See also 
List of Jewish fraternities and sororities
List of social fraternities and sororities

References

1998 establishments in California
Student societies in the United States
Historically Jewish sororities in the United States
Fraternities and sororities in the United States
Student organizations established in 1998